Kenya Police Football Club is an association football club based in Nairobi, Kenya. The team currently competes in the Kenya Premier League, after achieving promotion from the Kenyan National Super League after beating Vihiga United by an aggregate of 2:1 in a two legged final. They play their home games at the APTC Ground.

The club is owned and run by the Kenyan Administration Police.

Football clubs in Kenya
Police association football clubs in Kenya